Kuznetsovo is a rural locality (a village) in Vorshinskoye Rural Settlement, Sobinsky District, Vladimir Oblast, Russia. The population was 6 as of 2010. There are 2 streets.

Geography 
Kuznetsovo is located 21 km north of Sobinka (the district's administrative centre) by road. Bakino is the nearest rural locality.

References 

Rural localities in Sobinsky District
Vladimirsky Uyezd